Tunnels is a subterranean fiction novel by British authors Roderick Gordon and Brian Williams. It was initially self-published as  The Highfield Mole in 2005, and re-released as Tunnels by The Chicken House in 2007. The story follows Will Burrows, a 14-year-old 'archaeologist', who stumbles upon an underground civilization called The Colony. Will and his friend Chester flee The Colony and set out to find Will's father, in the Deeps, a place even deeper in the Earth than The Colony.

Tunnels was critically well received, although some complaints about its lengthy, slow start were recorded. The book placed on The New York Times Children's Chapter Books Bestseller List in February and March 2008. It is the first book in the Tunnels series, and was followed by Deeper (2008), Freefall (2009), Closer (2010), Spiral (2011) and Terminal (2013). BBC Audiobooks and Recorded Books have released audio editions.

Plot
The main influence in fourteen-year-old Will Burrows’ life is his father, Dr. Burrows, and together they share an interest in archaeology and a fascination for the buried past. When Dr. Burrows begins to notice strange 'pallid men' where they live in Highfield, and then promptly goes missing, Will and his friend Chester go search for him. They discover a blocked passageway behind bookshelves in the cellar of the Burrows home and re-excavated it, finding the passage leads to a door set into the rock, and beyond the door is an old lift that takes them down to another set of doors. A cobblestone street lies beyond, lit by a row of orb-like street lamps; houses that appear to be carved out of the walls themselves flank the street.

They are soon captured by the police of the underground community, known as the Colony. In prison, Will is visited by Mr. Jerome, and his son Cal. They reveal Will was actually born in the Colony, and that they are his real family; Mr. Jerome his father, and Cal his younger brother. Will is eventually released from the prison and taken to the Jerome's home, where Will and Cal's Uncle Tam are delighted to see him and inform Will that his adoptive father, Dr. Burrows, was recently there, and had willingly traveled down into the Deeps — a place even deeper in the Earth than The Colony. Will learns that the Styx, the religious rulers of the Colony, are either going to enslave Chester or banish him to the Deeps to fend for himself. Will refuses to abandon his friend, and Uncle Tam formulates a plan for him to rescue Chester and to take him back to the surface.

Will and Cal attempt to rescue Chester before he is sent to the deeps on the 'Miner's Train', but the Styx arrive and they are forced to leave Chester behind. During the botched escape attempt, it is revealed that Rebecca, Will's adoptive sister, is actually a Styx implanted in his family to monitor him. The boys head through a series of tunnels to the Eternal City, an old stone city, estimated by Will to be from Roman times, where the air is filled with deadly bio-toxins. They avoid the Styx soldiers, who patrol the city with their vicious stalker attack dogs, and eventually emerge on the bank of the Thames. Will makes for his home in Highfield, but there Will's health deteriorates, so Cal helps him to his Auntie Jean's flat where he recovers. Soon they return underground to find Will's adoptive father and attempt to rescue Chester once again. They encounter another Styx patrol, and Uncle Tam kills a member of the Styx, whom he calls Crawfly, but is mortally wounded in the fight, and the strong-willed Uncle Tam chooses to stay behind to give the boys time to escape. With the help of Imago Freebone, a member of Uncle Tam's gang, Will and Cal escape to a small hiding place halfway between the Colony and the Eternal City. There, they rest and mourn for Uncle Tam; and are told by Imago that Chester's train to the deeps will pass directly under their hiding spot shortly. They jump down into the train through a hole in the floor of the hiding spot and find Chester. Together they ride down to the Deeps. In the book's epilogue, Rebecca kills Imago, who was hiding on the surface, by poison.

Publication history
The novel was initially self-published under the title The Highfield Mole: The Circle in the Spiral on 17 March 2005, with a limited run of 500 hardbacks and 2,000 softback copies, financed by the sale of Roderick Gordon's house. The book received some trade press attention before launch and the entire hardback run sold within a day. On 19 November 2005, Barry Cunningham, of Chicken House, announced that he had agreed to publish The Highfield Mole and a second book in the series. Cunningham, while working for Bloomsbury in London, famously signed up J. K. Rowling, and this connection led to the book being branded "the next Harry Potter".

The authors and Barry Cunningham also decided to retitle the book Tunnels, to reflect that it had been changed by some limited editing. With the announcement of the publication date, and press coverage in the UK, the price of the original self-published books jumped dramatically, with one copy selling for £950. Tunnels was released in the UK as a softcover on 2 July 2007, and in the United States as a hardcover on 10 December 2007, and as a paperback on 1 February 2009. In Canada, the book was released as a paperback on 7 July 2007, as a hardcover on 1 January 2008, and a mass market paperback on 1 February 2009. In the United States, Tunnels had an initial printing of 100,000 copies. In February and March 2008 it appeared on The New York Times Children's Chapter Books Best Seller List.

The sequel, Deeper, was released in the UK on 5 May 2008 (in the United States on 3 February 2009), and a third book, Freefall, was published in the UK on 18 May 2009 (in the United States on 1 February 2010). The fourth book, called Closer, was published in the UK in May 2010, and the fifth, Spiral, was released on 1 September 2011, the authors released the final novel, Terminal, in 2013, concluding the series as a hexalogy.

Critical reception
Many reviewers criticized the first third of Tunnels for its slow pace, but praised the remainder of the book for its fast-paced excitement, suspense, and adventure. In Britain, children's author Philip Ardagh, reviewing for The Guardian, thought the long wait for Will to discover the underground city could dull the reader's anticipation, noting that the event did not occur until page 170. He did observe, however, that when the city is reached, "fantastic fun" begins and that from then on its well-paced, exciting and – in places – frightening and bloody." He thought the characters "splendidly named and drawn". In The Sunday Times of 7 July 2007, Nicolette Jones described the book as "a good adventure yarn ... [b]ut after 460 suspenseful pages it is frustratingly inconclusive." She noted the book became a best-seller the month of its release based simply on "stories about its discovery by [publisher] Barry Cunningham, who "found" Harry Potter."

Publishers Weekly thought the book "full of holes, as if its raison d'etre were to set up the action for future books". Like The Guardian, PW commented on the slow start but noted the pace picked up once the Colony was reached.  School Library Journal wrote that after a slow start, "the pace picks up", and praised the plot twists and the setting. Kirkus Reviews wrote "[d]ense but exciting" and Booklist thought "[the novel] appears to be a very promising series kickoff". The Horn Book Review felt readers "may lose patience with the slow beginning", but observed that adventure lovers would still like the plot.

Other formats
BBC Audiobooks Ltd. released an unabridged version of Tunnels on CD in the UK and Canada on 5 November 2007, and in the United States on 8 November 2007. Reader Jack Davenport garnered critical praise for his "haunting tone" and his ability to depict the people of The Colony with an Irish-sounding accent and their rulers with an "intimidating aristocratic hiss." In the United States, Recorded Books released an unabridged recording on 31 October 2008 read by Stephen Crossley.

In February 2013, Relativity Media announced it had assigned Mikael Håfström to direct a film adaptation of the novel.

The Polish publishers' website features an interactive game based on Tunnels.

References

External links
Tunnels Official Website
The Highfield Mole, Mathew & Son Official Website 
Chicken House Publishing Ltd.
Scholastic, US Publisher – includes video interview with authors 
UK Official Fansite for Tunnels series
Williamson Tunnels, Liverpool (UK)
Roderick Gordon interview at BookReviewsAndMore.ca

2007 British novels
2007 science fiction novels
English novels
Archaeology in popular culture
Fiction about cults
Fictional city-states
Novels set in subterranea
The Chicken House books